During the 1981–82 Scottish football season, Celtic competed in the Scottish Premier Division.

Competitions

Scottish Premier Division

League table

Matches

Scottish Cup

Scottish League Cup

European Cup

Glasgow Cup

Staff

Transfers

References

Scottish football championship-winning seasons
Celtic F.C. seasons
Celtic